Fyodor Evtikhievich Zubov (1615 – November 3, 1689), was a Russian painter, engraver, miniaturist and illuminator.

Biography
Zubov was born in Solikamsk, a member of the noble Zubov family. He began working in Veliky Ustyug and Yaroslavl. In 1662 he moved to Moscow where he worked with Simon Ushakov. His work included icons, illuminated manuscripts, drawings for engravings, and wall paintings. When Ushakov died in 1686, Zubov took over as the Director of the Imperial Workshop of Icon Painters in the Kremlin Armoury. He died in Moscow, in 1689.

References

1689 deaths
1615 births
People from Solikamsk
17th-century engravers
17th-century Russian painters
Russian male painters
Russian engravers